Neil Nicholas Mitchell (born 7 November 1974) is an English former professional footballer.

Playing career
Mitchell, a central midfielder, began his career as a trainee with Blackpool in 1991. He remained at Bloomfield Road for five years, making 67 league appearances and scoring eight goals. He was sent on loan to Rochdale in the 1995–96 season where he made his debut on 9 December 1995 against Doncaster Rovers and made four appearances. In March 1996 he joined Southport on loan.

He signed for Sammy McIlroy's Macclesfield Town, who were then in the Conference in August 1996. The Silkmen won promotion to the Football League that season. However, after playing just five games for Macclesfield in two years, Mitchell moved back to the Lancashire coast with Morecambe, then in the Conference, on 9 February 1998. He also went on to play for Northern Premier League club Chorley.

Post-retirement
Now retired from professional football Mitchell lives back on the Fylde coast where he coaches football at local schools with the YMCA, and also helps run Youth football tournaments each year.

He also plays Sunday League football, for Bloomfield Veterans FC, in the Blackpool & Fylde Sunday League Alliance Division One, since July 2004, along with fellow former Blackpool player, Andy Gouck. Mitchell also ran a successful 7-a-side league on a Monday night for many years.

References

External links

1974 births
Living people
People from Lytham St Annes
Association football midfielders
English footballers
Blackpool F.C. players
Rochdale A.F.C. players
Southport F.C. players
Macclesfield Town F.C. players
Morecambe F.C. players
Chorley F.C. players
English Football League players
National League (English football) players
Northern Premier League players